WYSIWYG is a 1992 CITV children's series broadcast in ITV. Five episodes were produced. It stars Julie Dawn Cole as Maz, Clive Mantle as Globyool and Nick Wilton as Wysiwyg.
 
Each episode starts as a different show (usually a parody of a popular ITV programme of the time, e.g. Blockbusters). The parody is then interrupted by am IGTV ("InterGalactic Television") broadcast from the planet Merdocc.

References

External links
 

1992 British television series debuts
1993 British television series endings
1990s British children's television series
British children's science fiction television series
British television shows featuring puppetry
ITV children's television shows
Television series by ITV Studios
Television series by Yorkshire Television
English-language television shows